The ST-class was a type of armored boat of the Imperial Japanese Army that saw service during World War II. She was developed in 1940 (Showa 15) mainly for riverine patrol in China, a role that was previously served by the Soukoutei-class armored boat. The prototype was 11 meters long with a beam of 2.00 meters and a draught of 1.10 meters. Her speed was 9.65 knots. All ships were built at the Yokohama shipyard of Mitsubishi Heavy Industries She was armed with a 37 mm gun (:jp:狙撃砲).

References

Ships of the Imperial Japanese Army
Ships built by Mitsubishi Heavy Industries